Pool B of the 2022 Billie Jean King Cup Americas Zone Group II was one of four pools in the Americas zone of the 2022 Billie Jean King Cup. Four teams competed in a round robin competition, with each team proceeding to their respective sections of the play-offs: the top team played for advancement to Group I in 2023.

Standings 

Standings are determined by: 1. number of wins; 2. number of matches; 3. in two-team ties, head-to-head records; 4. in three-team ties, (a) percentage of matches won (head-to-head records if two teams remain tied), then (b) percentage of sets won (head-to-head records if two teams remain tied), then (c) percentage of games won (head-to-head records if two teams remain tied), then (d) Billie Jean King Cup rankings.

Round-robin

Peru vs. Cuba

Venezuela vs. U.S. Virgin Islands

Peru vs. U.S. Virgin Islands

Venezuela vs. Cuba

Peru vs. Venezuela

Cuba vs. U.S. Virgin Islands

References

External links 
 Billie Jean King Cup website

2022 Billie Jean King Cup Americas Zone